Eric Spence (born 18 April 1961) is a Canadian hurdler. He competed in the men's 110 metres hurdles at the 1984 Summer Olympics.

References

1961 births
Living people
Athletes (track and field) at the 1984 Summer Olympics
Canadian male hurdlers
Olympic track and field athletes of Canada
Athletes (track and field) at the 1982 Commonwealth Games
Commonwealth Games competitors for Canada
Jamaican emigrants to Canada
Sportspeople from Kingston, Jamaica